The 1st Delta Operations Squadron (1 DOS) is a United States Space Force unit responsible for providing operations support to Space Delta 1 by serving as its headquarters staff. It also has a detachment that runs the service's basic military training. It was activated on 2 September 2021 and is located at Vandenberg Space Force Base, California.

Structure 
  Detachment 1, Joint Base San Antonio-Lackland, Texas

List of commanders 

 Lt Col Tara B. Brewer Shea, 2 September 2021 – present

See also 
 Space Delta 1

References

External links 
 

Military education and training in the United States
Squadrons of the United States Space Force